Francine Joy Drescher (born September 30, 1957) is an American actress, comedian, writer, activist, and trade union leader. She is known for her role as Fran Fine in the television sitcom The Nanny (1993–1999), which she created and produced with her then-husband Peter Marc Jacobson.

Drescher made her screen debut with a small role in the 1977 film Saturday Night Fever and later appeared in American Hot Wax (1978) and Wes Craven's horror tale Stranger in Our House (1978). In the 1980s, she gained recognition as a comedic actress in the films Gorp (1980), The Hollywood Knights (1980), Doctor Detroit (1983), This Is Spinal Tap (1984), and UHF (1989) while establishing a television career with guest appearances on several series. In 1993, she achieved wider fame as Fran Fine in her own sitcom vehicle The Nanny, for which she was nominated for two Emmy Awards and two Golden Globe Awards for Best Actress in a Comedy Television Series during the show's run. In the 2000s, Drescher starred in the sitcoms Living with Fran and Happily Divorced. Since 2012, she has starred in the animated Hotel Transylvania film series.

On February 4, 2014, Drescher made her Broadway debut in Cinderella as stepmother Madame. In 2020, she starred in the NBC sitcom Indebted.

The national members of the trade union SAG-AFTRA, representing actors and other media professionals, elected Drescher as their new president on September 2, 2021.

Early life and education
Drescher was born on September 30, 1957, in the Queens borough of New York City, New York,   the younger daughter of Sylvia, a bridal consultant, and Morty Drescher, a naval systems analyst. Her family is Jewish, from Southeast and Central Europe. Her maternal great-grandmother Yetta was born in Focșani, Romania, and immigrated to the United States, while her father's family came from Poland. She has an older sister.

Drescher was a first runner-up for "Miss New York Teenager" in 1973. She attended Flushing's Parsons Junior High School, which later dissolved, and then Hillcrest High School in Jamaica, Queens. There she met her future husband, Peter Marc Jacobson, whom she married in 1978, at age 21. They divorced in 1999. Drescher graduated from Hillcrest High School in 1975; one of her classmates was comedian Ray Romano. Drescher's character Fran Fine from The Nanny and Romano's character Ray Barone from Everybody Loves Raymond met at a 20th high school reunion on an episode of The Nanny.

Drescher and Jacobson attended Queens College, City University of New York, but dropped out in their first year because "all the acting classes were filled." They then enrolled in cosmetology school.

Career

Early career
Drescher's first break was a small role as dancer Connie in the movie Saturday Night Fever (1977), in which she delivered the line "So, are you as good in bed as you are on the dance floor?" to John Travolta's character. A year later, she began to gain attention in films such as American Hot Wax (1978) and Summer of Fear (1978). She also took on a rare dramatic role in the 1981 Miloš Forman film Ragtime.

During the 1980s, Drescher found success as a character actress with roles in films such as Gorp (1980), The Hollywood Knights (1980), Doctor Detroit (1983), The Big Picture (1989), UHF (1989), Cadillac Man (1990), and memorably in This Is Spinal Tap (1984) as publicist Bobbi Flekman. She also made an appearance in a second-season episode of Who's the Boss? in 1985 as an interior decorator. She also had an appearance on Night Court as a woman with dissociative identity disorder who flips from a prude to a sexually minded woman and ends up in a hotel with ADA Dan Fielding.

In 1990, Drescher appeared on ALF as Roxanne, the wife of grown-up Brian, who had no clue she was a mob boss, in the episode "Future's So Bright I Gotta Wear Shades".

In 1991, Drescher co-starred on the short-lived CBS sitcom Princesses. In the early-to-mid 1990s, she voiced "Peggy" from The P Pals on PBS (the woman with the flower on her hat).

The Nanny and film roles

Drescher and Jacobson created their own television show, The Nanny, in 1993. The show aired on CBS from 1993 to 1999, and Drescher became an instant star. In this sitcom, she played a woman named Fran Fine who casually became the nanny of Margaret ("Maggie") (played by Nicholle Tom), Brighton ("B") (played by Benjamin Salisbury), and Grace ("Gracie") Sheffield (played by Madeline Zima); with her wit and her charm, she endeared herself to their widower father: stuffy, composed, proper British gentleman and Broadway producer Maxwell Sheffield (Charles Shaughnessy). She reprised her This is Spinal Tap character of Bobbi Flekman, a look-alike for her Fran Fine character, in Season 5, Episode 3 of The Nanny.

Drescher appeared in Jack (1996), directed by Francis Ford Coppola, The Beautician and the Beast (1997) (for which she was also executive producer) and Picking Up the Pieces (2000) co-starring Woody Allen. She was also the voice of "Pearl" in Shark Bait (2006).

Return to television
In the 2000s, Drescher made a return to television both with leading and guest roles. In 2003, Drescher appeared in episodes of the short-lived sitcom Good Morning, Miami as Roberta Diaz. In 2005, she returned with the sitcom Living with Fran, in which she played Fran Reeves, a middle-aged mother of two living with Riley Martin (Ryan McPartlin), a man half her age and not much older than her son. Former Nanny costar Charles Shaughnessy appeared as her philandering ex-husband, Ted. Living with Fran was cancelled on May 17, 2006, after two seasons.

In 2006, Drescher guest-starred in an episode of Law & Order: Criminal Intent; the episode, "The War at Home", aired on US television on November 14, 2006. She also appeared in an episode of Entourage and in the same year, gave her voice to the role of a female golem in The Simpsons episode "Treehouse of Horror XVII". In 2007, Drescher appeared in the US version of the Australian improvisational comedy series Thank God You're Here.

In 2008, Drescher announced that she was developing a new sitcom entitled The New Thirty, also starring Rosie O'Donnell. A series about two old high school friends coping with midlife crises, Drescher described the premature plot of the show as "kind of Sex and the City but we ain't getting any! It'll probably be more like The Odd Couple." It was never produced.

In 2010, Drescher returned to television with her own daytime talk show, The Fran Drescher Tawk Show. While the program debuted to strong ratings, it ended its three-week test run to moderate success, resulting in its shelving. The following year, the sitcom Happily Divorced, created by Drescher and her ex-husband, Peter Marc Jacobson, was picked up by TV Land for a ten-episode order. It premiered there June 15, 2011. The show was renewed in July 2011 for a second season of 12 episodes, which aired in spring 2012. On May 1, 2012, TV Land extended the second season and picked up 12 additional episodes, taking the second season total to 24. The back-order of season two debuted later in 2012. Happily Divorced was cancelled in August 2013.

To promote Happily Divorced, Drescher performed the weddings of three gay couples in New York City using the minister's license she received from the Universal Life Church. Drescher hand-picked the three couples, all of whom were entrants into "Fran Drescher's 'Love Is Love' Gay Marriage Contest" on Facebook, based on the stories the couples submitted about how they met, why their relationship illustrated that "love is love" and why they wanted to be married by her.

Broadway
Drescher made her Broadway debut on February 4, 2014, in the revival of Rodgers and Hammerstein's Cinderella. She replaced Harriet Harris as stepmother Madame for a 10-week engagement. She reprised the role during the North American tour's engagement in Los Angeles, lasting from March through April 2015. Drescher's previous stage performances include an off-Broadway production of Nora Ephron's Love, Loss, and What I Wore, and Camelot at the Lincoln Center with the New York Philharmonic. On January 8, 2020, it was announced that Drescher and Jacobson were writing the book for a musical adaptation of The Nanny. Rachel Bloom and Adam Schlesinger of Crazy Ex-Girlfriend fame will write the songs, while Marc Bruni (Beautiful: The Carole King Musical) will direct. Drescher will not portray the title role, as she joked that if she did "We'd have to change the title to The Granny."

Trade union leader 
In 2021, Drescher began her campaign to become president of the SAG-AFTRA union, citing both her entertainment and political background. Her candidacy comes from the "Unite for Strength" faction, and she ran against actor Matthew Modine. On September 2, 2021, SAG-AFTRA announced that Drescher had won the election.

Personal life
Fran Drescher met Peter Marc Jacobson when she was 15 years old. The two were high school sweethearts and married at 21.

In January 1985, two armed robbers broke into Drescher and Jacobson's Los Angeles apartment. While one ransacked their home, Drescher and a female friend were raped by the other robber at gunpoint. Jacobson was also physically attacked, tied up, and forced to witness the entire ordeal. It took Drescher many years to recover, and it took her even longer to tell her story to the press. She was paraphrased as saying in an interview with Larry King that although it was a traumatic experience, she found ways to turn it into something positive. In her book Cancer Schmancer, the actress writes: "My whole life has been about changing negatives into positives." According to Drescher, her rapist, who was on parole at the time of the crime, was returned to prison and given two life sentences.

After having separated in 1996, Drescher and Jacobson divorced in 1999. They had no children. Drescher has worked to support LGBT rights issues after her former husband came out. Drescher has stated that the primary reason for the divorce was her need to change directions in life. Drescher and Jacobson remain friends and business partners. She has stated that "we choose to be in each other's lives in any capacity. Our love is unique, rare, and unconditional; unless he's being annoying."

On September 7, 2014, Drescher and Shiva Ayyadurai participated in a ceremony at Drescher's beach house. Both tweeted that they had married and the event was widely reported as such. Ayyadurai later said it was not "a formal wedding or marriage," but a celebration of their "friendship in a spiritual ceremony with close friends and her family." The couple parted ways two years later.

Cancer battle

After two years of symptoms and misdiagnoses by eight doctors, Drescher was admitted to Los Angeles's Cedars Sinai Hospital on June 21, 2000, after doctors diagnosed her with uterine cancer. She had to undergo an immediate radical hysterectomy to treat the disease. Drescher was given a clean bill of health and no post-operative treatment was ordered.

She wrote about her experiences in her second book, Cancer Schmancer. Her purpose for this book was to raise consciousness for men and women "to become more aware of the early warning signs of cancer, and to empower themselves". Drescher says, "I was going to learn what I needed to learn, ask questions, become partners with my doctor instead of having some kind of parent/child relationship."

Cancer Schmancer Movement
On June 21, 2007, the seventh anniversary of her operation, Drescher announced the national launch of the Cancer Schmancer Movement, a non-profit organization dedicated to ensuring that all women's cancers be diagnosed while in Stage 1, the most curable stage. She celebrated her tenth year of wellness on June 21, 2010.

Drescher says:

She says her goal is to live in a time when women's mortality rates drop as their health care improves and early cancer detection increases.

Politics

In September 2008, Drescher, a Democrat, was appointed as a U.S. diplomat by George W. Bush administration's Assistant Secretary of State Goli Ameri. Her official title was Public Diplomacy Envoy for Women's Health Issues. In traveling throughout the world, she supported U.S. public diplomacy efforts, including working with health organizations and women's groups to raise awareness of women's health issues, cancer awareness and detection, and patient empowerment and advocacy. Her first trip was in late September and included stops in Romania, Hungary, Serbia, and Poland.

In 2008, Drescher supported Senator Hillary Clinton for the Democratic Party presidential nomination. She attended a Super Democrat rally for Clinton. Drescher said that she had been considering a run for the United States Senate in 2008 to succeed Hillary Clinton, but ultimately decided against it. She endorsed Barack Obama for re-election in 2012. In 2017, she said in an interview she was explicitly anti-capitalist and was happy to see the Green Party gaining some traction.

In 2022, Drescher described vaccine mandates as "infringement on the Disabilities Act, the Freedom of Religion Act, and body sovereignty", warning that fear may "lead to fascism".

Charity
In April 2014, Drescher presented at Broadway Cares/Equity Fights AIDS Easter Bonnet Competition with Bryan Cranston, Idina Menzel and Denzel Washington, after raising donations at her Broadway show Cinderella. Drescher became an ordained minister with the Universal Life Church Monastery so that she could legally officiate LGBT wedding ceremonies.

Awards

Drescher has been the recipient of the John Wayne Institute's Woman of Achievement Award, the Gilda Award, the City of Hope Woman of the Year Award, the Hebrew University Humanitarian Award, and the Albert Einstein College of Medicine's Spirit of Achievement Award. In 2006, she was honored with the City of Hope Spirit of Life Award, which was presented to her by Senator Hillary Clinton. On April 10, 2010, she was guest of honor at the "Dancer against Cancer" charity ball held at the Imperial Palace, Vienna, Austria, where she received the first "My Aid Award" for her achievements in support of cancer prevention and rehabilitation. In 2021, Drescher was awarded the LifeSaver Award by ELEM/Youth in Distress.

Filmography

Film

Television

Books

References

External links

 Cancer Schmancer Movement website
 
 
 
 
 Fran Drescher Speaks Out in Support of New Bill Seeking Stricter Cosmetics Rules – video by Democracy Now!

1957 births
Living people
20th-century American actresses
20th-century American comedians
21st-century American actresses
21st-century American comedians
20th-century American Jews
21st-century American Jews
Activists from New York (state)
Actresses from New York City
American anti-capitalists
American film actresses
American memoirists
American people of Polish-Jewish descent
American people of Romanian-Jewish descent
American television actresses
American television directors
American television talk show hosts
American television writers
American voice actresses
American women comedians
American women memoirists
American women television producers
American women television writers
Comedians from New York City
Hillcrest High School alumni (Queens)
Jewish American actresses
American LGBT rights activists
New York (state) Democrats
People from Queens, New York
Presidents of the Screen Actors Guild
Queens College, City University of New York alumni
Screenwriters from New York (state)
Television producers from New York City
American women television directors
Presidents of SAG-AFTRA
American trade union leaders
Women trade union leaders